Medical Law International is a peer-reviewed law review that covers issues in medical law, bioethics, and health governance. It was established in 1993 and is currently published by SAGE Publications. The editors-in-chief are Shawn Harmon (Edinburgh Law School) and Paula Case (Liverpool Law School). The journal was established by Dianne Longley and Vivienne Harpwood and was edited by Shaun Pattinson from 2005 to 2011.

References

External links 
 

British law journals
Medical law
SAGE Publishing academic journals
Quarterly journals
Publications established in 1993
English-language journals
Medical law journals
Health law journals